Anticheta atriseta is a species of fly in the family Sciomyzidae, the marsh flies or snail-killing flies.

References

Sciomyzidae
Insects described in 1849
Diptera of Europe
Taxa named by Hermann Loew